Around London, England, Green Line may refer to:

 Green Line Coaches, serving the Home Counties
 Green Line Coach Station, in Victoria
 The District Line, coloured dark green on the London Underground diagram